"Static" is a 1988 song written by Full Force and recorded by James Brown. It was released as a single from Brown's album I'm Real and was charted at number 5 in the Billboard Hot R&B/Hip-Hop Songs chart. Reviewing the album, People singled "Static" out for praise, calling it "inflammatory". It contains samples of four songs, "I Know You Got Soul", "Hot Pants (I'm Coming, I'm Coming, I'm Coming)", "Alice, I Want You Just for Me", and "Hot Pants Road". It was the last Top 40 hit of Brown's career.

The song's title inspired the identity of the DC Comics superhero Static.

Sample used
Big Daddy Kane - "Raw"

References

James Brown songs
1988 singles
1988 songs